Beckham is an English-language placename, and a surname derived from Beckham, Norfolk. Notable people with the name include:
Albert Sidney Beckham (1897–1964), African American psychologist
Barry Beckham (born 1944), American playwright and novelist
Bob Beckham (1927–2013), American country singer
Brice Beckham (born 1976), American actor
Brooklyn Beckham (born 1999), English model and photographer, son of David Beckham
Chayce Beckham (born 1997), American singer-songwriter and musician, winner of the nineteenth season of the singing show American Idol
Clark Beckham (born 1992), American singer-songwriter and musician
David Beckham (born 1975), English former footballer
Gordon Beckham (born 1986), American baseball player
J. C. W. Beckham (1869–1940), American politician and former Governor of Kentucky and US Senator
Janette Hales Beckham (born 1933), American politician from Utah and Mormon women's leader
Joseph Beckham (born 1945), American university chairman
Lauren Beckham (born 1984), American personal trainer and figure competitor
Mike Beckham (born 1970), Cook Islands rugby union player
Odell Beckham Jr. (born 1992), American football player
Robert Franklin Beckham (1837–1864), American artillery officer
Rodrigo Beckham (born 1976), Brazilian footballer
Stephen Dow Beckham, American historian
Thomas Beckham (1810–1875), New Zealand politician
Tim Beckham (born 1990), American baseball player
Tony Beckham (born 1978), American football player
Trap Beckham (born 1991), stage name of Travis Cave, American hip hop artist
Victoria Beckham (born 1974), English singer, songwriter, fashion designer and television personality, wife of David Beckham

References

English toponymic surnames